Nembrionic was a Dutch death metal band. They were formed in 1991 under the name Nembrionic Hammerdeath as a black metal band; they changed their name to Nembrionic in 1993. The band released three albums on Displeased Records and another together with Osdorp Posse. They split up in 1999.

Biography
The band started in April 1991, influenced by Venom, Possessed, and Terrorizer, and recorded a demo in that same year. Their 1992 EP sold 1800 copies and garnered the band a record deal with Dutch metal label Displeased Records. They moved toward grindcore and death metal on Tempter, a split with Consolation. The band played about 30 shows to promote the album and went on tour with At the Gates and Consolation.

Hammerdeath was dropped from the name in 1995, and their next album, Psycho One Hundred, led to shows at open air festivals such as Liberation Day, Mundial, and Lowlands, and even a show in Rotterdam Ahoy. In 1996, they joined with Osdorp Posse to record Briljant, Hard en Geslepen, which charted in the Netherlands. Nembrionic played at Dynamo Open Air and Pinkpop Festival, and even opened for Slayer in Paradiso, June 1996.

Their second to last release was Bloodcult, which contained some home recordings and other songs besides almost the entire 1992 EP. Their final effort was Incomplete, "[their] answer to the fading brutality in the music scene."

Discography
 Lyrics of Your Last Will (demo, 1991)
 Themes on an Occult Theory (EP, 1992)
 Tempter (split with Consolation, Displeased Records, 1993)
 Hardcore Leeft (split EP with Consolation and Osdorp Posse, 1994)
 Psycho One Hundred (CD, Displeased, 1995)
 Briljant, hard en geslepen (with Osdorp Posse; CD, Displeased, 1996)
 Bloodcult (MCD, Displeased, 1997)
 Incomplete (CD, Displeased, 1998)

Members
 Jamil Beroud - bass
 Dennis Jak - guitar
 Noel Van Eersel - drums
 Marco "Bor" Westenbrink - guitar, vocals

References 
"Nembrionic/Nembrionic Hammerdeath."

External links
Metal Archives site

Dutch black metal musical groups
Dutch death metal musical groups
Musical groups established in 1991
Musical groups disestablished in 1999
Musical quartets
1991 establishments in the Netherlands